Saccharomyces mikatae, a type of yeast in the Saccharomyces sensu stricto complex. Its type strain is NCYC 2888T. The cells are round to short-oval in shape, they arrange singly, in pairs and short-chain. Their budding is multipolar.

See also 
Saccharomyces kudriavzevii
Saccharomyces cariocanus
Saccharomyces paradoxus

References

Further reading

External links 
UniProt entry
Genome.jp entry
Straininfo entry
CBS-KNAW Fungal Diversity Centre entry
MycoBank entry
Saccharomyces mikatae MIT superfamily genome assignments
Fungal tree the link doesn't work anymore
Bioontology.erg entry
Alanine and Aspartate metabolism in Saccharomyces mikatae

mikatae
Yeasts used in brewing
Fungi described in 2000